The Screaming Meemees were a New Zealand post-punk-new wave band formed in the early 1980s. The band formed in Auckland in 1979, while at school at Rosmini College on Auckland's North Shore, composed of vocalist Tony Drumm, guitarist Michael O'Neill, keyboard and bass player Peter van der Fluit and drummer "Laurence "Yoh" Landwer-Johan. The band was propelled into the limelight, in part, by the inclusion of their single All Dressed Up in the compilation album  Class of 81 produced by Simon Grigg's Propeller Records. By late 1980, the band was at the forefront of what was called the "North Shore Invasion". The Screaming Meemees were named "Most Promising Group" at the 1981 New Zealand Music Awards.

In early 1981, The Screaming Meemees released the single, "Can’t Take It", with The Newmatics’ "Judas" on the flip side. The single sold about 2000 copies and entered the top 40 in New Zealand. This was followed by the "Screaming Blamatic Roadshow", which included label-mates Blam Blam Blam and The Newmatics.

The follow-up single was See Me Go, released as a limited release 12" edition, and a 7". Despite being unavailable after the initial week of release, the song was briefly the number one single on the New Zealand charts. This accomplishment was achieved with little airplay outside of student radio. The single was the first New Zealand single to enter the charts at number one. This was followed by Sunday Boys in December, 1981, which was also a Top 20 single (without airplay).

The band's final single was Stars in My Eyes, released in 1982. By 1983, the band were making their last performances, including billing as the headlining act at the 1983 Sweetwaters Music Festival. The band split in April 1983 but reformed in August 1983 for two shows. They have not played publicly since.

Discography

Albums

Singles

References

External links 
 Propeller Records The Screaming Meemees biography
 
 AudioCulture profile

Musical groups established in 1980
Musical groups disestablished in 1982
New Zealand new wave musical groups
New Zealand post-punk music groups